is a district of Naka Ward in Yokohama, Japan, located immediately west of Yamate and east of Chinatown. It consists mainly of the Motomachi Shopping Street, a five-block long stretch of boutiques and shops, well known in Japan for its cosmopolitan atmosphere, original fashion, and Western influence.

History 
Motomachi was originally a quiet farming and fishing village until 1859, when the Port of Yokohama was opened.  Since then, the close-by Kannai district became the foreigners' business district, and the adjacent Yamate and Yamashitacho districts became the foreigners' residential districts.  Situated in-between, with Yamate to the east, and Kannai and Yamashitacho to the west, Motomachi became frequented by many foreigners.  Shops and businesses were opened, catering to the needs of foreigners.

Soon after the start of the Meiji era, the number of foreign residents increased. And western influence became more evident in Motomachi, with the opening of many cafés, bakeries, and boutiques.  Such shops were uncommon in Japan at the time, and Motomachi helped introduce Western culture into Japan, as part of what is called .  This was the beginning of the Motomachi Shopping Street as it is known as of 2008.

The most famous producers of the hama tora style were Kitamura , Mihama , and Fukuzō , three of the most fashionable boutiques in Motomachi.

In the 1960s, on one end of Motomachi stood the German Bakery and next door was the fantastic Madame Pompadour Bakery with the best puff pastry imaginable.  When the aromas filled the street on Saturday mornings it was beyond description.  On the end stood (and stands today) Nakayas grocery store, which sold wonderful liquor spiked communist jellies and jams from Czechoslovakia; nearby the vinyl record store which made available many popular 45 rpm records of the day on RCA Victor such as the Monkees and the Beatles.  In between as today stands the Union Supermarket where one could purchase US or Japanese versions of the same cereals such as Sugar Pops.  And across the street stood the French Restaurant with the best chocolate ice cream.

Naming 
Upon the opening of the Port of Yokohama in 1859, this area was called . The name was changed to Motomachi in 1860.

Education
The  operates public elementary and junior high schools.

Motomachi is zoned to Motomachi Elementary School (元街小学校), which feeds into Minato Junior High School (横浜市立港中学校).

Notes

References 
This article was translated from the corresponding article in the Japanese Wikipedia, retrieved on September 9, 2006, and with a few minor changes.

External links 

 History of Motomachi
  Motomachi Shopping Street (official website)

Naka-ku, Yokohama
Neighborhoods of Yokohama
Shopping districts and streets in Japan
Tourist attractions in Yokohama